Habakkuk 1 is the first chapter of the Book of Habakkuk in the Hebrew Bible or the Old Testament of the Christian Bible. This book contains the prophecies attributed to the prophet Habakkuk, and is a part of the Book of the Twelve Minor Prophets. This chapter and the next form a unit, which Sweeney sees as "a report of a dialogue between the prophet and YHWH" about the fate of Judah which the biblical scholars, such as F. F. Bruce, label as "the oracle of Habakkuk".

Text
The original text was written in Hebrew language. This chapter is divided into 17 verses.

Textual witnesses
Some early manuscripts containing the text of this chapter in Hebrew language are found among the Dead Sea Scrolls, i.e., 1QpHab, known as the "Habakkuk Commentary" (later half of the 1st century BC), and of the Masoretic Text tradition, which includes Codex Cairensis (895 CE), the Petersburg Codex of the Prophets (916), Aleppo Codex (10th century), Codex Leningradensis (1008). Fragments containing parts of this chapter in Hebrew were found among the Dead Sea Scrolls, that is, Wadi Murabba'at Minor Prophets (Mur88; MurXIIProph; 75-100 CE) with extant verses 3–13, 15.

There is also a translation into Koine Greek known as the Septuagint, made in the last few centuries BC. Extant ancient manuscripts of the Septuagint version include Codex Vaticanus (B; B; 4th century), Codex Sinaiticus (S; BHK: S; 4th century), Codex Alexandrinus (A; A; 5th century) and Codex Marchalianus (Q; Q; 6th century). Fragments containing parts of this chapter in Greek were found among the Dead Sea Scrolls, that is, Naḥal Ḥever 8Ḥev1 (8ḤevXIIgr); late 1st century BCE) with extant verses 5–11, 14–17.

Verse 1 
 The burden which Habakkuk the prophet did see. (KJV)
This verse serves as a "superscription" for the prophecies recording in Habakkuk 1:2-2:20, whereas chapter 3 has a separate superscription in Habakkuk 3:1.
 "burden", can be translated as "oracle" according to the New King James Version. It is used to open the prophecies in the Book of Nahum, Zechariah and Malachi, as well as found multiple times in the Book of Isaiah.

Verse 8 
Their horses also are swifter than the leopards, and are more fierce than the evening wolves: and their horsemen shall spread themselves, and their horsemen shall come from far; they shall fly as the eagle that hasteth to eat.

Verse 8 in Hebrew 
Masoretic Text
וְקַלּוּ מִנְּמֵרִים סוּסָיו וְחַדּוּ מִזְּאֵבֵי עֶרֶב וּפָשׁוּ פָּֽרָשָׁיו וּפָֽרָשָׁיו מֵרָחֹוק יָבֹאוּ יָעֻפוּ כְּנֶשֶׁר חָשׁ לֶאֱכֹֽול׃

Transliteration:
 veqalu min'merim susav vekhadu miz'evey 'erev ufasyu parasyav ufarasyav merakhoq yavou yaufu kenesyer khasy le'ekhol

Verse 8 notes 
 Sweeney notes that this verse describes the "menacing Babylonian cavalry" with fast and fearsome horses as well as their skillful horsemen.
 Wolves is translated from the Hebrew: זְאֵב  (scientific name: Canis lupus), in particular, "evening wolves".

See also 
 Related Bible parts: Nahum 1

References

Sources

External links 

Historic manuscripts
 The Commentary on Habakkuk Scroll, The Digital Dead Sea Scrolls, hosted by the Israel Museum, Jerusalem.

Jewish translations
 Chavakuk – Habakkuk (Judaica Press) translation [with Rashi's commentary] at Chabad.org

Christian translations
Online Bible at GospelHall.org (ESV, KJV, Darby, American Standard Version, Bible in Basic English)
  Various versions

Further information
 A Brief Introduction to The Prophecy of Habakkuk for Contemporary Readers (Christian Perspective)
 Introduction to the book of Habakkuk from the NIV Study Bible
 Introduction to the Book of HabakkukForward Movement Publications

01
Babylonia